van Dis is a surname. Notable people with the surname include: 

 Adriaan van Dis (born 1946), Dutch author
Leendert van Dis (born 1944), Dutch rower
 Maarten van Dis (born 1936), Dutch rower
 

Surnames of Dutch origin